Chermoshnya may refer to:

Chermoshnya, Kaluga Oblast, a village in Kaluga Oblast, Russia
Chermoshnya, Tula Oblast, a village in Tula Oblast, Russia